Jewish magic may refer to:

 Practical Kabbalah
 Jewish magical papyri
 Witchcraft and divination in the Hebrew Bible
 Semitic neopaganism

See also
 Christian magic
 Enochian magic (angelic magic)
 Goetia (demonic magic)
 Islam and magic
 Thaumaturgy (miraculous magic)
 Theurgy (divine magic)